Yevgeny Sokolov (born 11 January 1931) is a Lithuanian middle-distance runner. He competed in the men's 1500 metres at the 1956 Summer Olympics, representing the Soviet Union.

References

External links
 

1931 births
Possibly living people
Athletes (track and field) at the 1956 Summer Olympics
Lithuanian male middle-distance runners
Soviet male middle-distance runners
Olympic athletes of the Soviet Union
Place of birth missing (living people)